Chinese Taipei competed at the 1994 Asian Games in Hiroshima, Japan. This was their 6th appearance in the Asian Games. They won at total of 7 gold, 13 silver, and 24 bronze medals, or 44 medals in total. They improved from the previous Asian Games in 1990, where they won a total of 31 medals. They won the most medals in Judo, where they got a total of 1 silver and 5 bronze.

It was their 6th best performance of all time in the Asian Games, and their best performance before 1998. After their performance in 1994, they started gradually improving, getting a record total of 77 medals at the 1998 Asian Games. They were ranked 7th out of the 42 nations that competed in the Asian Games, falling behind China, Japan, South Korea, Kazakhstan, Uzbekistan, and Iran.

Athletes with medals
Wu Tsung-yi
Wang Huei-chen
Hsu Pei-ching
Ma Chun-ping
Chen Chun-hungChen Kai-faHo Chih-fanHsieh Fu-gueyHsu Sheng-chiehHuang Ching-chingHuang Hsin-fuHuang Kan-linHuang Kuei-yuHung Chi-fengKao Chien-sanLiang Ju-haoLin Hung-yuanLin Sheng-hsiungLin Yueh-liangLiu Chih-shengWu Chun-liangWu Wen-yuYang Fu-chunYeh Chun-chang
Lin Han-chen
Chen Ling-iWeng Feng-yingChiu Shu-meiYang Lin-huaChou Miao-lin
Yang Hsiu-chen
Lan Chung-hsiungChen Hsiang-fuKang Yu
Chen Hui-mingHuang Han-wenChou Min-kunSu Cheng-hung
Chinese Taipei National Football team
Huang Yu-chen
Chan Chin-sha
Lee Jui-hui
Lo Yu-wei
Yeh Wen-hua
Huang Yu-hsin
Tseng Hsiao-fen
Wu Mei-ling
Chen Chiu-ping
Su Su-chen
Chen Shu-chen
Liu Ya-chen
Liao Yun-chih
Lin Chia-huiHuang Shu-meiLin Ya-tingChuang Yen-chun
Chang Hsiao-chingChang Mei-lanCheng I-wenChien Chen-juChiu Chen-tingChung Chiung-yaoFeng Shu-fangHan Hsin-linHsu Chun-huaLee Ming-chiehLiu Chia-chiShih Mei-lingShih Mei-yunTu Hui-pingWang Ya-fenYang Hui-chunYen Show-tzu
Chiang Peng-lungXu Jing
Wu Wen-chiaChen Jing
Chang Jung-san
Chang Jung-san
Jane ChiHo Chiu-meiWang Shi-tingWeng Tzu-ting
Liao Hsing-chou
Kuo Shu-fen
Lin Ya-ching
Chen Shu-chih
Chen Hsiao-lien

References

Nations at the 1994 Asian Games
Asian Games
Chinese Taipei at the Asian Games